West Side Story Reimagined is an album by Bobby Sanabria, released in 2018. It was recorded live at Dizzy’s Club Coca-Cola in Manhattan. A large portion of the proceeds from the album went toward helping musicians in Puerto Rico who had been affected by Hurricane Maria.

Reception
West Side Story Reimagined was nominated for a Grammy in the category of Best Latin Jazz album.

In 2019, the album won the Jazz Journalists Award for best Record of 2018.

Track listing
Act 1

 Intro – (:33)
 Prologue – arranged by Jeremy Fletcher (7:39)
 Intro Jet Song – (:12)
 Jet Song – arranged by Niko Siebold (6:03)
 Intro America – (:09)
 America – arranged by Jeff Lederer (6:34)
 Gee, Officer Krupke Intro – (:15)
 Gee, Officer Krupke – arranged by Jeremy Fletcher (6:00)
 Tonight – arranged by Matt Wong (5:49)
 Gym Scene – Blues/Mambo – arranged by Danny Rivera
 Gym Scene – Cha Cha Cha – arranged by Nate Sparks (4:45)

Act 2

 Maria – arranged by Eugene Marlow, vocals/rhythm arranged by Bobby Sanabria (8:15)
 Intro Cool – (:07)
 Cool – arranged by Andrew Neesley (5:50)
 The Rumble/Rumba – arranged by Takao Heisho (5:38)
 One Hand, One Heart – arranged by Jeremy Fletcher (5:03)
 Somewhere – arranged by Jeremy Fletcher (3:55)
 Intro Epilogue/Finale – (1:14)
 Epilogue/Finale – arranged by Jeremy Fletcher (2:52)
 Outro – (2:21)

References

2018 albums